Formula 1 Debrief was a show on the American channel Speed (TV channel). It started airing on
April 4, 2009, and ended on December 1, 2012. The "roundtable" show included Speed's 3 former F1 broadcasters covered the previous Formula 1 race, showed highlights and commenting on them. The three personalities were Bob Varsha, Steve Matchett, and David Hobbs with clips of Will Buxton, Speed's only broadcaster presented at F1 races.

Schedule
Each race's review show usually aired on the weekend of the next Grand Prix race; e.g., the review of the Korean race aired on the weekend of the Brazilian race, not on the 'off' weekend between the races.

External links
 http://www.speedtv.com/programs/formula-one-debrief/

References
 http://www.speedtv.com/programs/formula-one-debrief/

.

2009 American television series debuts
2012 American television series endings
Automotive television series
Speed (TV network) original programming